United Acid Emirates is an acid house album by Ceephax Acid Crew, released in 2010 on Planet Mu. The Roland TB-303 synthesizer is prominently featured on the album's cover art.

Track listing

CD release 
 Cedric's Sonnet – 3:07
 Castilian – 4:54 †
 New River Company – 2:23
 Commuter – 5:31
 Glocker – 1:06 †
 Life Funk – 5:21
 Sidney's Sizzler – 5:21
 Trabzonspor – 3:02
 Topaz – 2:54
 Emotinium II – 8:16
 The Celebrity – 3:57
 Denizlispor – 2:03
 Arcadian (Castilian II) – 4:05
 Royal Lounge – 4:11

† indicates CD-only track

Vinyl release

Side one 
 Cedric's Sonnet – 3:07
 Commuter – 5:31
 New River Company – 2:23

Side two 
 Life Funk – 5:21
 Sidney's Sizzler – 5:21
 Trabzonspor – 3:02

Side three 
 Topaz – 2:54
 Emotinium II – 8:16
 The Celebrity – 3:57

Side four 
 Arcadian (Castilian II) – 4:05
 Royal Lounge – 4:11
 Denizlispor – 2:03

References 

 United Acid Emirates (CD) at Discogs
 United Acid Emirates (vinyl) at Discogs

Planet Mu albums
Ceephax Acid Crew albums
2010 albums